Propionibacterium namnetense is a Gram-positive, anaerobic, pleomorphic and rod-shaped bacterium from the genus Cutibacterium which has been isolated from a samples of human bone infection in Nantes, France.

References 

Propionibacteriales
Bacteria described in 2016